The Fairey Firefly  IIM was a British fighter of the 1930s.
It was a single-seat, single-engine biplane of all-metal construction. Built by Fairey Aviation Company Limited, it served principally with the Belgian Air Force throughout the 1930s until the outbreak of World War II.

Design and development
The Firefly was a private-venture design, penned by Marcel Lobelle, as the Curtiss D-12 powered Firefly I had been rejected owing to its American engine and its wooden structure, and could not be easily fitted with the larger and heavier geared Rolls-Royce Falcon XI favoured by the RAF. A completely new design, it shared little with the Firefly I beyond the name. Making use of experience gleaned from the earlier machine, it was developed in response to Specification F.20/27 for a single-seat interceptor. It first flew on 5 February 1929.

The Firefly II competed for the RAF contract against the Hawker Fury, showing superior speed but was criticised for having heavier controls. Crucially, it retained a mainly wooden structure despite the Air Ministry's demands for metal structures. This led to the Fury being selected. Afterwards, the prototype was rebuilt and renamed Firefly IIM, the "M" denoting the all-metal construction of the rebuilt machine.

A revised prototype with longer-span wings, the Firefly III was built to Specification N21/26 as a carrier-based fighter to replace the Fleet Air Arm's Fairey Flycatchers, first flying on 17 May 1929. Like the land-based fighter, it was rebuilt with more metal components as the Firefly IIIM, and again like the Firefly II, was beaten by a design produced by Hawker, in this case the Hawker Nimrod. Although no production orders ensued, the Firefly IIIM was fitted with floats and used as a trainer by the RAF's High Speed Flight preparing for the 1931 Schneider Trophy race.

Operational history
A contract was won for 25 IIM aircraft for Belgium's Aviation Militaire, followed by a contract for a further 62 to be constructed by Avions Fairey, Fairey's Belgian subsidiary. The Belgian aircraft served briefly in the Second World War from May to June 1940.

Two of the Belgian aircraft were converted to Firefly IV, with 785 hp (585 kW) Hispano-Suiza 12Xbrs engines but the improvement was not deemed sufficient to warrant development. One was restored to its original form, while the other passed to Fairey for trials. One aircraft was supplied to the Soviet Union.

Operators

Belgian Air Force

Royal Air Force
High Speed Flight RAF

Soviet Air Force – One Firefly Mk IIM, used for tests and trials.

Variants
 Fairey Firefly II
 Single-seat fighter prototype, powered by a 480 hp (360 kW) Rolls-Royce Kestrel piston engine. One built.
 Fairey Firefly IIM
 Single-seat single-engine fighter aircraft, of all-metal construction, equipped with resigned tail surfaces and revised engine cooling system.
 Fairey Firefly III
 Single-seat shipboard fighter prototype. One built.
 Fairey Firefly IIIM
 The Fairey Firefly III was rebuilt with all-metal construction and redesignated Firefly IIIM.
 Fairey Firefly IV
 Two Belgian Firefly IIs were converted, and fitted with the 785 hp (585 kW) Hispano-Suiza 12Xbrs engine.

Specifications (Firefly IIM)

See also

References

Notes

Bibliography

 Garcia, Dionisio. "Air Force on the Edge: Belgian Military Aviation in 1940". Air Enthusiast, November/December 2001, No. 96. pp. 65–68. .
 Green, William and Gordon Swanborough. The Complete Book of Fighters. New York: Smithmark, 1994. .
 Mason, Francis K. The British Fighter since 1912. Annapolis, Maryland: Naval Institute Press, 1992. 
 Pacco, John. "Fairey Firefly" Belgisch Leger/Armee Belge: Het militair Vliegwezen/l'Aeronautique militaire 1930–1940. Artselaar, Belgium, 2003, pp. 32–38. .
 Taylor, H. A. Fairey Aircraft since 1915. London: Putnam, 1988. .
 Taylor, John W. R. and Jean Alexander. Combat Aircraft of the World. New York: G.P. Putnam's Sons, 1969. .
 Willis, Matthew. "Database: Fairey Firefly". Aeroplane, August 2020, Vol. 48, No. 8. pp. 89–99. .

External links

Fairey Firefly II (Biplane) – British Aircraft of World War II

1920s British fighter aircraft
Firefly II
Single-engined tractor aircraft
Biplanes
Avions Fairey aircraft
Aircraft first flown in 1929